Trevor Shaw may refer to:
 Jimmy London (reggae singer), Jamaican reggae singer, born Trevor Shaw
 Trevor Ian Shaw, English experimental biologist
 T. R. Shaw (Trevor R. Shaw), English historian and speleologist